Ralph Massullo is a dermatologist and member of the Florida Legislature. A Republican, he represents the state's 34th House district, which includes Citrus County as well as part of Hernando.

History
A practicing dermatologist, Massullo is a native of Morgantown, West Virginia and a graduate of the West Virginia University School of Medicine.

Florida House of Representatives
Massullo was elected to the Florida House without opposition in 2016. In the November 6, 2018 general election, Massullo was re-elected with 69.29% of the vote, defeating Democrat Paul Reinhardt.

Financial disclosure forms submitted in 2020 showed that Massullo was likely the Florida Legislature's wealthiest member, with a net worth of $46.1 million.

References

Massullo, Ralph
Living people
21st-century American politicians
West Virginia University alumni
1956 births